Mads Wiel Nygaard's Endowment is an annually awarded literary prize from the publishing house Aschehoug. The prize is a recognition of superior literary work.  The publisher's editorial management makes the award based on their collective judgement of merit. Applications are not accepted.

The endowment is awarded in recognition of Mads Wiel Nygaard (1898–1952). Nygaard was the chief executive officer of Aschehoug. In 1940, he replaced his father William Martin Nygaard as CEO and served in that position until his own death during November 1952.

Prize winner
1953 - Magnhild Haalke and Lizzie Juvkam
1954 - Not awarded
1955 - Kristian Kristiansen
1956 - Not awarded
1957 - Not awarded
1958 - Egil Rasmussen
1959 - Harald Sverdrup
1960 - Gunnar Bull Gundersen
1961 - Arnulf Øverland
1962 - Peter R. Holm
1963 - Stein Mehren
1964 - Yngvar Hauge
1965 - Mikkjel Fønhus and Einar Skjæraasen
1966 - Torborg Nedreaas
1967 - Knut Hauge
1968 - Lars Berg and Kjell Heggelund
1969 - Kjell Askildsen and Dag Solstad
1970 - Simen Skjønsberg and Vigdis Stokkelien
1971 - Sissel Lange-Nielsen and Arild Nyquist
1972 - Finn Havrevold, Bjørn Gunnar Olsen, Kåre Prytz and Odd Solumsmoen
1973 - Finn Strømsted
1974 - Hans Børli
1975 - Liv Køltzow
1976 - Sidsel Mørck
1977 - Halldis Moren Vesaas
1978 - Vera Henriksen
1979 - Ingeborg Refling Hagen
1980 - Karsten Alnæs
1981 - Erling Pedersen
1982 - Erling Kittelsen and Helge Vatsend
1983 - Gerd Brantenberg
1984 - Jan Kjærstad
1985 - Gene Dalby, Anne Karin Elstad and Tove Lie
1986 - Øystein Wingaard Wolf
1987 - Jon Peter Rolie
1988 - Kari Bøge
1989 - Ketil Bjørnstad
1990 - Karin Moe and Hermann Starheimsæter
1991 - Marit Tusvik
1992 - Elin Brodin
1993 - Cindy Haug
1994 - Merethe Lindstrøm
1995 - Tom Lotherington
1996 - Aud Korbøl
1997 - Torild Wardenær
1998 - Unni Lindell
1999 - Toril Brekke
2000 - Håvard Syvertsen
2001 - Odd W. Surén
2002 - Jo Nesbø
2003 - Thure Erik Lund
2004 - Sigmund Jensen
2005 - Eldrid Lunden
2006 - Bjarte Breiteig
2007 - Carl Frode Tiller
2008 - Geir Gulliksen
2009 - Arne Lygre
2010 - Ingrid Storholmen
2011 - Kurt Aust
2012 - Wenche-Britt Hagabakken
2013 - Tom Egeland
2014 - Lars Petter Sveen
2015 - Helga Flatland
2016 - Aasne Linnestå
2017 - Inger Elisabeth Hansen
2018 - Johan B. Mjønes
2019 - Erlend O. Nødtvedt

References

Other sources
Rudeng, Erik, Magisteren. Mads Wiel Nygaard. Et hundreårsminne (Oslo: Aschehoug 1998) 

Norwegian literary awards